Tears of Heaven is a 2014 South Korean television drama series starring Park Ji-young, Hong Ah-reum, Seo Jun-young and Jo Yun-seo. It aired on MBN from October 11, 2014 to January 3, 2015 for 25 episodes.

Plot 
Yoon Cha-young learns that her mother Yoo Sun-kyung abandoned her as a child because of selfish ambition, so she seeks her out to get her revenge

Cast

Main characters 
Park Ji-young as Yoo Sun-kyung
Seo Yoon-ah as young Yoo Sun-kyung
Hong Ah-reum as Yoon Cha-young
Jeon Min-seo as young Yoon Cha-young
Seo Jun-young as Lee Ki-hyun / Cha Sung-tan
Shin Ki-joon as young Cha Sung-tan
Jo Yun-seo as Jin Je-in
Kim So-yeon as young Jin Je-in
Lee Jong-won as Lee Do-yeob
Yoon Da-hoon as Jin Hyun-tae
Kim Yeo-jin as Pan Hye-jung
In Gyo-jin as Jin Hyun-woong

Supporting characters 
Park Geun-hyung as Jin Man-bok
Yoon Joo-sang as Lee Gook-hwan
Park Jung-soo as Mrs. Jo
Lee Yong-yi as Yoon Eun-ja
Choi Hyun as Park Man-ki
Yoon Sang-hoon as Secretary Cha
Joo Min-ha as Go Jung-eun

Cameo appearances 
Lee Han-wi as Orphanage director
Jin Kyung as Adoptive mother
Lee Byung-wook as Adoptive father

Remake
The drama was remade in Turkish language as Cennet'in Gözyaşları.

References

External links 
 Tears of Heaven official MBN website 
 

2014 South Korean television series debuts
2015 South Korean television series endings
Korean-language television shows
South Korean melodrama television series
Maeil Broadcasting Network television dramas